25C-NBF (2C-C-NBF, NBF-2C-C) is a derivative of the phenethylamine hallucinogen 2C-C, which acts as a highly potent partial agonist for the human 5-HT2A receptor.

Legality

Sweden
The Riksdag added 25C-NBF to Narcotic Drugs Punishments Act under swedish schedule I ("substances, plant materials and fungi which normally do not have medical use") as of January 26, 2016, published by Medical Products Agency (MPA) in regulation HSLF-FS 2015:35 listed as 25C-NBF, and 2-(4-kloro-2,5-dimetoxifenyl)-N-(2-fluorobensyl)etanamin.

United Kingdom

Analogues and derivatives

References 

25-NB (psychedelics)
Designer drugs